The Sikorsky S-3 was an early Russian single seat biplane design by Igor Sikorsky. Work on the machine started in July 1910 and was completed in late November.

Design and development
The S-3 was a larger improved version of the S-2 with a more powerful  Anzani three-cylinder engine. The main wings were manufactured in a more uniform manner with the ribs held to a closer tolerance and the fabric covering was of better quality. Other refinements included larger ailerons and faster-responding flight control surfaces.

Operational history
The S-3 exhibited performance superior to the S-2, and Sikorsky made a dozen successful flights starting early in December. The S-3 made its last flight on December 13, 1910 when at an altitude of 90 feet the engines distributor shifted to a retarded position and lost power. The aircraft landed hard on a frozen pond, broke through the ice and sank causing serious damage. The S-3 was salvaged and some parts including the engine were used in the construction of the S-4.

Specifications

References

S-3
Biplanes
Single-engined tractor aircraft
Aircraft first flown in 1910